Namibia: The Struggle for Liberation is a 2007 epic film on the Namibian independence struggle against South African occupation as seen through the life of Sam Nujoma, the leader of the South West Africa People's Organisation and the first president of the Republic of Namibia. The film was written and directed by Charles Burnett and stars Carl Lumbly and Danny Glover. The production was financed by the government of Namibia. Music composed by Stephen James Taylor won the award for Best African Film at the Kuala Lumpur International Film Festival where the film also won for Best Music Score and for Best Director.

The film's dialogue is in English, Afrikaans, Oshiwambo, Otjiherero, and German.

References

External links

2007 films
2000s war drama films
Afrikaans-language films
Apartheid films
Cold War films
2000s English-language films
Epic films based on actual events
Films about presidents
Films about race and ethnicity
Films about racism
Films based on actual events
Films directed by Charles Burnett (director)
Films scored by Stephen James Taylor
Films set in 1978
Films set in Angola
Films set in Namibia
Films set in the 1960s
Films shot in Namibia
2000s German-language films
Historical epic films
History of Namibia
Namibian drama films
South African Border War films
War films based on actual events
2007 drama films